Bruno Alexandre Marques Madeira (born 17 September 1984) is a Portuguese professional footballer who plays for Carvalhais Futebol Clube as a defensive midfielder.

Club career
Madeira was born in Viseu. After starting playing with hometown club Académico de Viseu F.C. he first reached the professional level in 2005–06, with G.D. Chaves in the second division, appearing in 30 games and scoring once during the season. He suffered relegation with the northern side in 2007.

In 2008, Madeira moved to another team in the third level, F.C. Penafiel, which he helped promote as champions. He subsequently returned to division two with Gil Vicente FC, re-joining his previous club for the 2010–11 campaign, in the same tier.

Madeira moved abroad in the summer of 2011, signing for FC Brașov in Romania and joining a host of compatriots at the Liga I side.

References

External links

1984 births
Living people
People from Viseu
Portuguese footballers
Association football midfielders
Liga Portugal 2 players
Segunda Divisão players
Académico de Viseu F.C. players
G.D. Chaves players
F.C. Penafiel players
Gil Vicente F.C. players
Liga I players
FC Brașov (1936) players
CS Concordia Chiajna players
Portuguese expatriate footballers
Expatriate footballers in Romania
Portuguese expatriate sportspeople in Romania
Sportspeople from Viseu District